Ahmad Muhammad Al-Khatib (1927 – 6 March 2022) was a Kuwaiti politician. A founder of the Arab Nationalist Movement and the Kuwait Democratic Forum, he served in the National Assembly from 1963 to 1965, 1971 to 1976, and 1985 to 1996. He died in Kuwait City on 6 March 2022, at the age of 95.

Notes

References

1927 births
2022 deaths
Members of the National Assembly (Kuwait)
Kuwaiti physicians
American University of Beirut alumni
People from Kuwait City